Benjamin C. Tousey House, also known as "The Willows," is a historic home located at Clinton in Dutchess County, New York.  The property includes six contributing buildings and one contributing structures.  They are the main house, a stone cottage with garage in the basement, a stone garage, a frame lodge, two frame sheds, and a gazebo.  The main house was built in 1914-1915 and is a compactly designed, two story rectangular house with arelatively low pitched roof.  The ground floor is clad in wood shingles and the upper floor in stucco and half timbers.  It features a complex arrangement of balconies and terraces and is representative of the American Craftsman style.

It was added to the National Register of Historic Places in 1994.

References

Houses on the National Register of Historic Places in New York (state)
Houses completed in 1915
Houses in Dutchess County, New York
Bungalow architecture in New York (state)
American Craftsman architecture in New York (state)
National Register of Historic Places in Dutchess County, New York